Vivi may refer to:

People
 Vivi Bach (1939–2013), Danish actress and singer
 Vivi Fernandez (born 1977), Brazilian model
 Vivi Flindt (born 1943), Danish ballerina
 Vivi Friedman (1967–2012), Finnish film director
 Vivi Gioi (1917–1975), Italian actress
 Vivi Jiang (born 1988), Chinese pop singer
 Vivi Krogh (1919–2014), Norwegian anti-immigration activist
 Vivi Zigler, American television executive
 Albert Vivancos (born 1994), commonly known as Vivi, Spanish footballer
 ViVi (born 1996), stage name of Wong Gaahei, Hong Kong born singer based in South Korea, member of Loona

Places
 Vivi, Democratic Republic of the Congo, a town
 Lake Vivi in Evenkia, Russia
 Vivi (river), a tributary of the Nizhnyaya Tunguska in Evenkia, Russia
 Río Viví, a river in Puerto Rico

Fictional characters
 Nefertari Vivi, in the manga and anime One Piece
 Vivi (Final Fantasy), in the role-playing game Final Fantasy IX
 Vivi, main character of Siren's second and final season

Other uses
 Vivi (magazine), a Japanese fashion magazine for young women
 ViVi (single album), by Loona
 ViVi (virtual assistant) developed by Vingroup special for VinFast

See also

 
 Viiv (disambiguation)
 Vi (disambiguation)

Hypocorisms